Fine Air Flight 101 was a scheduled cargo flight from Miami International Airport to Las Américas International Airport, operated by McDonnell Douglas DC-8-61F N27UA, that crashed after take-off on August 7, 1997, at Miami International Airport. All 4 people on board and one person on the ground were killed.

Aircraft

The aircraft involved in the accident was a 29-year-old McDonnell Douglas DC-8-61F, msn/ C/n: 45942/349, registration N27UA, operated by Fine Air, with total airframe hours of 46,825 and 41,688 cycles.

Crew and passenger 
There were three crew members and a security guard on board. The captain, 42-year-old Dale Patrick "Pat" Thompson, had been with Fine Air since 1993. He had a total of 12,154 hours of flying time, including 2,522 hours as a DC-8 captain at Fine Air. The first officer, Steven Petrosky, aged 26, hired on 15 August 1994, had a total of 2,641 hours of flying time, of which 1,592 hours were with Fine Air in DC-8s and logged 614 hours as first officer and 978 hours as a flight engineer, all in the DC-8. The flight engineer, Glen Millington, aged 35, had joined Fine Air in 1996. He had logged a total of 1,570 flight hours, including 683 hours as a DC-8 flight engineer at Fine Air. The security guard on board was 32-year-old Enrique Soto.

Crash 
 
The aircraft, bound for Santo Domingo, lost control shortly after takeoff. It "pitched up quickly into a stall, recovered briefly from the stall, and stalled again".

The McDonnell Douglas DC-8 missed the auto transport loading facility at the south end of the Miami City Rail Yard just north of the end of the runway, and also busy cargo operations facilities along the very busy NW 25th Street feeder to the airport's cargo area just to the south of the end of the runway. The aircraft barely missed two factories, a commercial building, and the Budweiser Distribution Center in unincorporated Miami-Dade County, Florida between the populated residential suburbs of Miami Springs and Doral. It skidded across an open field and onto NW 72nd Ave, a roadway that is typically full of traffic during the lunch hour and was full at the time of the accident, though the portion Flight 101 struck had red lights at both intersections. The plane's wreckage skidded quickly across the roadway and onto the parking lot of a commercial mini-mall across the street from the empty field; it hit 26 cars in the lot. At that time the mini-mall was a hub of computer parts distributors specializing in South American commerce.

The plane's wreckage fell four feet short of the entrances to three shops. Inside one of the cars in the parking lot sat a 34-year-old man named Renato Alvarez who had just arrived back at his shop in the mini-mall after picking up lunch for his wife and himself. He was unable to make it out of the car and was caught up in the fireball that engulfed the multi-lane avenue, field, and parking lot.

Five people were killed in total: the three aircrew members, a company security guard on the flight, and the man in the parking lot. In the minutes following the crash, police were alerted to a fire at NW 72nd Ave, only to discover it was a plane crash. For nearly 45 minutes, mixed reports claimed the plane was a passenger flight, but within the hour the control tower at MIA confirmed it was Fine Air Cargo Flight 101. FAA Security Special Agents working out of an office on airport property (at that time) responded to the scene and simultaneously to the Fine Air Cargo offices, where they took possession of the flight documentation. Some relevant documentation was recovered from garbage receptacles, causing a criminal investigation to be opened and ultimately leading to charges including destruction and covering-up of evidence. Fine Air and their ground-handling agent Aeromar Airlines pleaded guilty to several of the charges and were fined approximately $5 million.

Investigation 
The National Transportation Safety Board (NTSB) found that the airplane's center of gravity was near or even aft of the airplane's limit and the airplane's trim was mis-set.  Both resulted from cargo loading irregularities.  The severity of the control problem could not be determined because of uncertainty about the cargo weight distribution.  It would have required exceptional skills and reactions which could not be expected from the pilots.

The NTSB found that "a significant shift of cargo rearward at or before rotation did not occur and was not the cause of the initial extreme pitch up at rotation." Cargo compression or shifting may have occurred later.

Ground crew interviews found that the flight was routinely full of pallets and the cargo locks were rarely engaged in some opinions, and it was further stated this was because they were thought to be irrelevant if the pallets could not move. Pallets are held by rails at the sides from moving in an upward direction, but only the retractable end locks can stop the forward-and-aft movement. Also, the aircraft was approximately  overloaded, although, given the pallet weighing process, this was believed to be more common than thought beforehand.

NTSB determination 

The NTSB released the accident report on June 16, 1998. The "probable cause" reads:

In popular culture 
The crash of Fine Air Flight 101 is featured in the 5th episode of Season 19 of Mayday (Air Crash Investigation). The episode is titled "Deadly Pitch".

References

External links 

NTSB investigation docket

 Aviation accidents and incidents in 1997
 Accidents and incidents involving the Douglas DC-8
 Accidents and incidents involving cargo aircraft
 Airliner accidents and incidents in Florida
Airliner accidents and incidents caused by stalls